The Rika is a right tributary of the river Tisza in the Zakarpattia Oblast, western Ukraine. It rises in the Eastern Carpathians. It flows through the town Mizhhirya and discharges into the Tisza near Khust.

References

Rivers of Zakarpattia Oblast
Braided rivers in Ukraine